Rainbow Warrior (sometimes informally called Rainbow Warrior II) was a three-masted schooner most notable for service with the environmental protection organization Greenpeace.  She was built to replace the original Rainbow Warrior that the French intelligence service (DGSE) bombed in 1985 in the Port of Auckland, New Zealand, which sank the ship and killed photographer Fernando Pereira.

The Rainbow Warrior II was built from the hull of the deep sea fishing ship Ross Kashmir (later Grampian Fame), which had been built by Cochrane & Sons of Selby, North Yorkshire and launched in 1957. Greenpeace gave the vessel new masts, a gaff rig, a new engine and a number of environmentally low-impact systems to handle waste, heating and hot water. She was officially re-launched in Hamburg on 10 July 1989, the fourth anniversary of the bombing of her predecessor, the original Rainbow Warrior.

History 
Over the course of her career, Rainbow Warrior participated in activist campaigns such as blockading the Russian whaling fleet, protesting French nuclear weapons testing, and stopping ships with cargos of coal and palm oils, as well as humanitarian activities such as evacuating the inhabitants of Rongelap after the island was contaminated by nuclear testing, and providing aid after the 2004 Indian Ocean tsunami. Rainbow Warrior, piloted by skipper Mike Fincken, docked at the Legazpi City port in Albay on 22 May 2008 for a one-month-long "Quit Coal, Save the Climate" Philippines tour and campaign aimed to educate people on the effects of the use of coal on the environment, specifically on climate change. The tour proposed alternative energy sources such as geothermal and solar energy.

Rainbow Warrior damaged the Tubbataha Reef, a world heritage site in the Philippines in 2005. Greenpeace was fined $7,000 for damaging almost  of the coral reef. Greenpeace blamed faulty maps provided by the Philippine government for the accident.   The BBC quoted Greenpeace official Red Constantino as saying "The chart indicated we were a mile and a half" from the coral reef when the ship ran aground. Greenpeace paid the fine.

Legacy 
Rainbow Warrior was retired in August 2011 and sold to Friendship, a Bangladesh-based NGO, to serve as a hospital ship, renamed Rongdhonu, Bengali for rainbow. She docked in the port of Chittagong on 29 August to undergo a refitting for that purpose. Rainbow Warrior III was launched in October 2011.

The NGO Friendship sold the ship for scrapping in a Bangladesh scrap yard in 2018.

Image gallery

See also
 Legend of the Rainbow Warriors
 List of schooners
 Tubbataha Reef grounding incidents

References

External links

 Official Greenpeace page on the Rainbow Warrior
 New Zealand website on the Rainbow Warrior
 Australian Greenpeace website on the Rainbow Warrior 
 Specifications of the Rainbow Warrior (on Greenpeace site)

Ships built in Selby
Schooners
Anti–nuclear weapons movement
Three-masted ships
1957 ships
Ships of Greenpeace